Delias clathrata is a butterfly in the family Pieridae. It was described by Walter Rothschild in 1904. It is found in New Guinea.

The wingspan is about 60–66 mm. Adults are mostly white. The hindwings have a black discal area over which the white veins show out very strongly.

Subspecies
 D. c. clathrata (Papua New Guinea: Aroa River)
 D. c. limata Jordan, 1930 (New Guinea: Herzog Mountains)

References

External links
Delias at Markku Savela's Lepidoptera and Some Other Life Forms

clathrata
Butterflies described in 1904